Israel participated in the Eurovision Song Contest 2019 with the entry "Home" written by Ohad Shragai and Inbar Weitzman. The Israeli broadcaster Israeli Public Broadcasting Corporation (IPBC/Kan) collaborated with the commercial broadcaster Keshet and Tedy Productions, which organisied the reality singing competition HaKokhav HaBa L'Eurovizion ("The Next Star for Eurovision"). On 12 February, Kobi Marimi won the competition and therefore performed the Israeli song in the Eurovision Song Contest.

As the host country, Israel automatically qualified to compete in the final.

Background 

Prior to the 2019 contest, Israel had participated in the Eurovision Song Contest forty-one times since its first entry in 1973. Israel has won the contest on four occasions: in 1978 with the song "A-Ba-Ni-Bi" performed by Izhar Cohen and the Alphabeta, in 1979 with the song "Hallelujah" performed by Milk and Honey, in 1998 with the song "Diva" performed by Dana International, and in 2018 with the song "Toy" performed by Netta Barzilai. Since the introduction of the semi-finals in 2004, Israel has failed to reach the final six times. In , Shiri Maimon gave the country its tenth top five result, finishing fourth. Israel's fourth victory came when Netta won the  contest in Lisbon, with the song "Toy".

The Israeli entry for the 2019 contest in Tel Aviv was selected through the reality singing competition  ("The Next Star for Eurovision"), which was organised by Keshet and Tedy Productions. This was the fifth time that the Israeli entry was selected through a collaboration with Keshet and Tedy Productions.

Before Eurovision

HaKokhav HaBa L'Eurovizion 
The singer who would perform the Israeli entry for the Eurovision Song Contest 2019 was selected through the reality singing competition  ("The Next Star for Eurovision"), the original version of the international format Rising Star produced by Tedy Productions and Keshet Media Group.  has been used since 2015 to select the Israeli artist for Eurovision. The shows were hosted by Assi Azar and Rotem Sela and featured a judging panel composed of Asaf Amdursky, Keren Peles, Shiri Maimon (2005 Israeli Eurovision entrant), Harel Skaat (2010 Israeli Eurovision entrant) and Static & Ben-El Tavori.

The competition commenced on 24 November 2018 and concluded on 12 February 2019.

In addition, three programs were broadcast on Kan to determine the song that would represent Israel in 2019. Kan also held an additional show to select one singer to go through to the final of HaKokhav HaBa L’Eurovizion.

Shows

Auditions 
The auditions were broadcast between 24 November 2018 and 1 January 2019. 59 of the 105 contestants advanced to the next phase following achieving at least 70% of the votes while 9 contestants who did not get enough votes to qualify were saved by the hosts.

Among the contestants were Danielle Mazuz, who previously took part in the Eurovision Song Contest 2018 as a backing vocalist and dancer behind Netta, and Maya Bouskilla who was a candidate to represent Israel in the Eurovision Song Contest 2009, 2011 and 2012.

On 2 January 2019 one of the originally advanced contestants, Elkana Marziano announced that he would withdraw from the competition.

Shortlisting rounds 
The shortlisting rounds were broadcast between 7 and 10 January 2019. 20 of the 67 contestants advanced to the next phase of the competition. The results were decided with the same method as in the auditions with the only difference that votes in this round were cast solely by the judges, therefore each judge could add 20% to the contestant's final score. Each shortlisting round consisted of two rounds: in the first round all contestants performed behind the wall. The contestants with a score of at least 60% advanced to the second round where the judges decided which contestants advance to the next phase of the competition.

Top 20 round 
The Top 20 round was broadcast between 13 and 15 January 2019. The remaining 20 contestants were paired in 10 duels. From each duel, the contestant with the higher score advanced to the next phase of the competition. At the end of the duels, two contestants who did not win their duels were saved by the judges and the remaining contestants were eliminated.

Static and Ben-El Tavori did not attend the shows, therefore they did not vote. They were replaced by singer Itay Levi in the judging panel.

Elimination shows

Heat 1 
The first heat was broadcast on 19 January 2019. The remaining twelve contestants were paired in five thematical duels: the contestants of the first duel had to show their style, the second duel consisted of songs of divas, in the third duel four contestants were paired in two duets, the contestants in the fourth duel had to sing about a personal story and the fifth duel consisted of former Eurovision Song Contest entries. From each duel, the contestant with the higher score advanced to the next phase of the competition. At the end of the duels, five contestants who did not win their duels were saved by the judges and the remaining one contestant was eliminated.

Heat 2 
The second heat was broadcast on 20 and 21 January 2019. The remaining eleven contestants were paired in duels. From each duel, the contestant with the higher score advanced to the next phase of the competition while the contestant with the lowest score at that moment had to choose its opponent at the end of each duel. At the end of the duels, the contestant with the lowest score was eliminated.

Heat 3 
The third heat was broadcast on 26 January 2019. The remaining ten contestants were paired in four thematical duels: in the first duel four contestants were paired in two duets, the contestants in the second duel had to sing about a personal story, the third duel consisted of votes of the audience only and the contestants in the fourth duel had to sing in duet with one of the judges, Harel Skaat. From each duel, the contestant with the higher score advanced to the next phase of the competition. At the end of the duels, four contestants who did not win their duels were saved by the judges and the remaining one contestant was eliminated.

In the first and fourth duel, Harel Skaat was replaced by Gali Atari who, as part of Milk and Honey, won the Eurovision Song Contest 1979.

Heat 4 
The fourth heat was broadcast on 27 and 28 January 2019. The remaining nine contestants performed behind the wall except for the first contestant. At the end of the performances, the contestant with the lowest score was eliminated.

Semi-final 1 
The first semi-final was broadcast on 2 February 2019 and consisted of two rounds: four of the remaining eight contestants were paired in two duels in the first round. From each duel, the contestant with the higher score advanced to the second round. At the end of the first round, one of the remaining two contestants was saved by the judges and the other contestant was eliminated. The winners of the two duels were paired in a third duel in the second round.
At the end of the duel, each judge allocated twelve points to their favourite and ten points to their runner-up. In addition to the votes of the judges, 40 points in proportion to the votes of the audience were also allocated to the two contestants. In the end, the contestant with the higher number of points advanced directly to the final and the other contestant advanced to the next phase of the competition.

In addition to the individual performances, the four contestants performed I Gotta Feeling prior to the first round.

On 5 February 2019 Shalva Band announced that they would withdraw from the competition.

Semi-final 2 
The second semi-final was broadcast on 3 February 2019 and consisted of two rounds: four of the remaining eight contestants were paired in two duels in the first round. From each duel, the contestant with the higher score advanced to the second round. At the end of the first round, one of the remaining two contestants was saved by the judges and the other contestant was eliminated. The winners of the two duels were paired in a third duel in the second round.
At the end of the duel, each judge allocated twelve points to their favourite and ten points to their runner-up. In addition to the votes of the judges, 40 points in proportion to the votes of the audience were also allocated to the two contestants. In the end, the contestant with the higher number of points advanced directly to the final and the other contestant advanced to the next phase of the competition.

In addition to the individual performances, the four contestants performed Can't Stop the Feeling prior to the first round.

Semi-final 3 
The third semi-final was broadcast on 4 February 2019. The remaining four contestants who did not advance automatically to the final performed behind the wall except for the first contestant. At the end of the performances, the contestant with the highest score advanced to the final.

Wildcard round 
The wildcard round was broadcast on 7 February 2019. Two previously eliminated contestants were paired in a duel. At the end of the duel, each judge allocated twelve points to their favourite and ten points to their runner-up. In addition to the votes of the judges, 40 points in proportion to the votes of the audience were also allocated to the two contestants. In the end, the contestant with the higher number of points returned to the competition and the other contestant was eliminated.

Semi-final 4 
The fourth semi-final was broadcast on 9 February 2019 and consisted of two rounds: the remaining four contestants were paired in two duels in the first round. From each duel, the contestant with the higher score advanced to the second round. At the end of the first round, one of the remaining two contestants was saved by the judges and the other contestant was eliminated. The remaining three contestants were paired in a third duel in the second round.
At the end of the duel, each judge allocated twelve points to their favourite, ten points to their runner-up and eight points to their least favourite. In addition to the votes of the judges, 60 points in proportion to the votes of the audience were also allocated to the three contestants. In the end, the two contestants with the highest number of points advanced to the final and the third-placed contestant was eliminated.

Final 
The final was held on 12 February 2019 and consisted of two rounds: the remaining four contestants were paired in two duels in the first round. From each duel, the contestant with the higher score advanced to the second round. In the first round, each judge could boost the contestants' score by three percent instead of the original eight. At the end of the first round, one of the remaining two contestants was saved by the viewers and the other contestant was eliminated.

The remaining three contestants were paired in a third duel in the second round. At the end of the duel, each judge allocated twelve points to their favourite, ten points to their runner-up and eight points to their least favourite. In addition to the votes of the judges, 270 points in proportion to the votes of the audience were also allocated to the three contestants. In the end, the contestant with the highest number of points won the competition.

Additionally, three thematical jury groups were asked to vote by the same method as the in-studio judges in the second round. The members of the three jury groups were:

 Group 1: Judges of Kokhav Nolad – Gal Uchovsky, Margalit Tzan'ani, Tzedi Tzarfati
 Group 2: Presenters of the Israeli Public Broadcasting Corporation – Avia Malka, Dafna Lustig, Lucy Ayoub
 Group 3: Composers of former Israeli Eurovision Song Contest entries – Kobi Oshrat, Stav Beger, Yoav Ginai

In addition to the individual performances, the four contestants performed a medley of Toy and High Hopes prior to the first round and the winner of the Eurovision Song Contest 2018, Netta performed Bassa Sababa as an interval act.

At Eurovision 
The Eurovision Song Contest 2019 will take place at the Expo Tel Aviv in Tel Aviv, Israel and consist of two semi-finals on 14 and 16 May and a final on 18 May 2019. According to Eurovision rules, all nations with the exceptions of the host country and the "Big Five" (France, Germany, Italy, Spain and the United Kingdom) were required to qualify from one of two semi-finals in order to compete for the final; the top ten countries from each semi-final will progress to the final. As the host country, Israel automatically qualifies to compete in the final. In addition to its participation in the final, Israel will also be required to broadcast and vote in one of the two semi-finals.

Israel was drawn to compete in the second half of the final, performing 14th, receiving a total of 35 points: 35 points from the televoting and 0 points from the juries. This makes it the fourth time since 2015 that the host country ranked in the bottom five.

Voting
Voting during the three shows involved each country awarding two sets of points from 1-8, 10 and 12: one from their professional jury and the other from televoting. Each nation's jury consisted of five music industry professionals who are citizens of the country they represent, with their names published before the contest to ensure transparency. This jury judged each entry based on: vocal capacity; the stage performance; the song's composition and originality; and the overall impression by the act. In addition, no member of a national jury was permitted to be related in any way to any of the competing acts in such a way that they cannot vote impartially and independently. The individual rankings of each jury member, as well as the nation's televoting results, were released shortly after the grand final.

Points awarded to Israel

Points awarded by Israel

Detailed voting results
The following members comprised the Israeli jury:
 Aviad Rosenbaum (jury chairperson)head of music Kan
 singer, songwriter
 professional singer, represented Israel in the 1981 contest as member of Hakol Over Habibi
  (Dikla)singer, songwriter, musician
 songwriter and composer

Notes and references

Notes

References 

2019
Countries in the Eurovision Song Contest 2019
Eurovision